In Ancient Greek mythology, Arktos (also written as Arctus) was a centaur who fought against the Lapith spearmen. It may also refer to 'bears' in Greek.

Mythology 

Arktos is briefly mentioned in Hesiod, Shield of Heracles 178 ff (trans. Evelyn-White) (Greek epic C8th or C7th B.C.)"[Amongst the scenes depicted on the shield of Herakles :] And there was the strife of the Lapithai (Lapith) spearmen gathered round the prince Kaineus (Caeneus) and Dryas and Peirithous (Pirithous), with Hopleus, Exadios, Phalereus, and Prolokhos (Prolochus), Mopsos the son of Ampykos (Ampycus) of Titaresia, a scion of Ares, and Theseus, the son of Aigeus (Aegeus), like unto the deathless gods. These were of silver, and had armour of gold upon their bodies. And the Kentauroi (Centaurs) were gathered against them on the other side with Petraios (Petraeus) and Asbolos the diviner, Arktos (Arctus), and Oureios (Ureus), and black-haired Mimas, and the two sons of Peukeus (Peuceus), Perimedes and Dryalos: these were of silver, and they had pinetrees of gold in their hands, and they were rushing together as though they were alive and striking at one another hand to hand with spears and with pines."

See also
Ursa Major
Arctic

Notes

References 

 Hesiod, Shield of Heracles from The Homeric Hymns and Homerica with an English Translation by Hugh G. Evelyn-White, Cambridge, MA.,Harvard University Press; London, William Heinemann Ltd. 1914. Online version at the Perseus Digital Library. Greek text available from the same website.
 Shield of Heracles 178 ff Greek epic C8th or C7th B.C.

Centaurs
Characters in Greek mythology